George Sotiropoulos (born 9 July 1977) is an Australian born retired mixed martial artist of Greek descent who previously fought in the UFC in their Lightweight division. He is well known for appearing as a fighter on the TV show The Ultimate Fighter: Team Hughes vs. Team Serra, fighting on Team Serra and as the coach for Team Australia on The Ultimate Fighter: The Smashes.

Mixed martial arts career

Background
Sotiropoulos began training in Brazilian jiu-jitsu in 1997 at the age of 19, and was promoted to black belt in 2004. In 2003 and 2007, he represented Australia in the Submission Wrestling World Championships. Sotiropoulos has also competed in amateur boxing, and in 2004, won a Victorian State Amateur Boxing Championship. Prior to his MMA career in the UFC, Sotiropoulos trained with veteran UFC and PRIDE fighter Enson Inoue. The two met during a winning bout Sotiropoulos had with Sergio Lourenço in Guam. He has remained affiliated with Enson Inoue's Purebred gyms throughout his career since then.

Following his appearance on The Ultimate Fighter: Team Hughes vs. Team Serra, Sotiropoulos moved to Long Island, NY to train at with Matt Serra Sotiropoulos then relocated to Las Vegas, Nevada, and trained at Xtreme Couture. During this time period he also trained at 10th Planet Jiu-Jitsu with Eddie Bravo.

Early career
Sotiropoulos made his professional debut in 2004 against fellow Australian Gavin Murie, in which Sotiropoulos was able to win via armbar submission in the first round. He went on to win two more fights until his first career loss via split decision to Kyle Noke in 2005, one year later he was able to avenge his first loss by defeating Noke by unanimous decision. Sotiropoulos went on to have a 7–2 record in small MMA organizations, until he was invited to participate in The Ultimate Fighter in 2007.

The Ultimate Fighter
Sotiropoulos defeated Jared Rollins in the first round of the competition by KO. He went on to defeat Richie Hightower in the quarterfinals via submission due to a kimura. Sotiropoulos was then defeated by Tom Speer in the semi-finals by knockout, shortly after an accidental thumb to the eye.

Ultimate Fighting Championship
Sotiropoulos defeated Billy Miles at The Ultimate Fighter: Team Hughes vs Team Serra Finale via submission (rear-naked choke) at 1:36 of the first round.

Sotiropoulos defeated Roman Mitichyan at UFC Fight Night 13 on 2 April 2008 by TKO in the second round.

He was scheduled to fight judoka Karo Parisyan at UFC 87, however Sotiropoulos was forced to withdraw due to injury.

Sotiropoulos was then expected to face Matt Grice at UFC Fight Night 17, but was forced to withdraw due to another injury.

After an 18-month break in his career, Sotiropoulos switched weight classes, winning his Lightweight debut at UFC 101 on 8 August 2009 against George Roop. During the bout, he showcased his high level grappling skills, passing Roop's guard with ease. Sotiropoulos eventually forced the tap out with a kimura lock in the second round.

Sotiropoulos defeated Ultimate Fighter 9 alumni Jason Dent in the second round via armbar submission on 21 November 2009, at UFC 106. In a post-fight interview following the win, Sotiropoulos stated his desire to compete at the UFC 110 card, in Sydney, Australia. Sotiropoulos' wish was granted and faced Joe Stevenson on 21 February 2010 at UFC 110. Making his first appearance on the main card of a UFC pay-per-view event, Sotiropoulos improved to 5–0 in the UFC as he defeated Stevenson via unanimous decision (30–27, 30–27, 30–27) in a dominant performance, prompting Dana White to say that Sotiropoulos was "in the mix" for a title shot. The fight earned Sotiropoulos his first Fight of the Night award in the UFC.

Sotiropoulos fought Kurt Pellegrino at UFC 116 on 3 July 2010, and won by a commanding unanimous decision.

Sotiropoulos then faced Joe Lauzon on 20 November 2010 at UFC 123. Sotiropoulos survived a fast start by his opponent, thus gassing Lauzon in one round, and allowing Sotiropoulos to dominate the next round, winning by kimura in the second round in a bout that won Fight of the Night honors. The win pushed Sotiropoulos to a perfect 7–0 record in the UFC and established him as one of the top contenders in the UFC's lightweight division.

Sotiropoulos suffered his first UFC loss to Dennis Siver via unanimous decision at UFC 127. Sotiropoulos was unable to take the fight to the ground and was forced to strike with the German Kickboxing Champion Siver. The loss setback Sotiropoulos' chances of a title shot.

Sotiropoulos was expected to face Evan Dunham on 2 July 2011 at UFC 132. However, Dunham was forced out of the bout with an injury, and replaced by Rafael dos Anjos. Sotiropoulos was knocked out just 59 seconds into the first round.

Sotiropoulos was expected to face former PRIDE Lightweight Champion Takanori Gomi on 26 February 2012 at UFC 144. However, Sotiropoulos was forced out of the bout with an injury and replaced by Eiji Mitsuoka.

In July 2012 Sotiropoulos was confirmed as the Australian coach for The Ultimate Fighter: The Smashes, and faced Ross Pearson on 15 December 2012 at the finale - UFC on FX 6. Pearson dominated him throughout the fight, and although he narrowly avoiding being knocked out several times, Sotiropoulos was visibly rocked in all three rounds; being knocked down in two of them. He eventually lost the fight via third-round TKO from Pearson.

Sotiropoulos faced Hawaiian K. J. Noons on 19 October 2013 at UFC 166. He lost the fight via unanimous decision.

After losing four in a row, Sotiropoulos was released from his UFC contract on 18 December 2013.

Titan Fighting Championship
On 22 January 2014 it was announced that Sotiropoulos had signed a four-fight contract with Titan Fighting Championship and was expected to debut on 25 April at Titan FC 28 against Mike Ricci however Ricci withdrew from the bout due to injury. The bout was rescheduled and took place at Titan FC 29 on 22 August 2014. He lost the fight via unanimous decision.

Other media
Sotiropoulous is featured in UFC Undisputed 3 as a Lightweight fighter alongside the likes of Clay Guida, Dennis Siver, Joe Lauzon and Frankie Edgar.

Personal life
Sotiropoulos has a Bachelor of Business in Banking and Finance, Associate Diploma of Business in International Trade from Victoria University in Melbourne, Australia. Prior to competing in mixed martial arts, he worked in the finance industry. After years of living in Washington state and New York City, Sotiropoulos moved to Melbourne, Australia in 2016 and currently manages his own MMA gym, Omega Jiu-Jitsu & MMA there.

Championships and accomplishments
Ultimate Fighting Championship
Fight of the Night (Two times)

Mixed martial arts record

|-
| Loss
| align=center| 14–7
| Mike Ricci
| Decision (unanimous)
| Titan FC 29: Ricci vs. Sotiropoulos
| 
| align=center| 3
| align=center| 5:00
| Fayetteville, North Carolina, United States
| 
|-
| Loss
| align=center| 14–6
| K. J. Noons
| Decision (unanimous)
| UFC 166
| 
| align=center| 3
| align=center| 5:00
| Houston, Texas, United States
| 
|-
| Loss
| align=center| 14–5
| Ross Pearson
| TKO (punches)
| UFC on FX: Sotiropoulos vs. Pearson
| 
| align=center| 3
| align=center| 0:41
| Gold Coast, Australia
| 
|-
| Loss
| align=center| 14–4
| Rafael dos Anjos
| KO (punch)
| UFC 132
| 
| align=center| 1
| align=center| 0:59
| Las Vegas, Nevada, United States
| 
|-
| Loss
| align=center| 14–3
| Dennis Siver
| Decision (unanimous)
| UFC 127
| 
| align=center| 3
| align=center| 5:00
| Sydney, Australia
| 
|-
| Win
| align=center| 14–2
| Joe Lauzon
| Submission (kimura)
| UFC 123
| 
| align=center| 2
| align=center| 2:43
| Auburn Hills, Michigan, United States
| 
|-
| Win
| align=center| 13–2
| Kurt Pellegrino
| Decision (unanimous)
| UFC 116
| 
| align=center| 3
| align=center| 5:00
| Las Vegas, Nevada, United States
| 
|-
| Win
| align=center| 12–2
| Joe Stevenson
| Decision (unanimous)
| UFC 110
| 
| align=center| 3
| align=center| 5:00
| Sydney, Australia
| 
|-
| Win
| align=center| 11–2
| Jason Dent
| Submission (armbar)
| UFC 106
| 
| align=center| 2
| align=center| 4:35
| Las Vegas, Nevada, United States
| 
|-
| Win
| align=center| 10–2
| George Roop
| Submission (kimura)
| UFC 101
| 
| align=center| 2
| align=center| 1:59
| Philadelphia, Pennsylvania, United States
| 
|-
| Win
| align=center| 9–2
| Roman Mitichyan
| TKO (punches)
| UFC Fight Night: Florian vs. Lauzon
| 
| align=center| 2
| align=center| 2:24
| Broomfield, Colorado, United States
| 
|-
| Win
| align=center| 8–2
| Billy Miles
| Submission (rear-naked choke)
| The Ultimate Fighter 6 Finale
| 
| align=center| 1
| align=center| 1:36
| Las Vegas, Nevada, United States
| 
|-
| Win
| align=center| 7–2
| Jung Hwan Cha
| Submission (armbar)
| Spirit MC 11: Invasion
| 
| align=center| 2
| align=center| 3:27
| Seoul, South Korea
| 
|-
| Loss
| align=center| 6–2
| Shinya Aoki
| DQ (groin strike)
| Shooto: Champion Carnival
| 
| align=center| 2
| align=center| 0:05
| Yokohama, Japan
| 
|-
| Win
| align=center| 6–1
| Shigetoshi Iwase
| Decision (unanimous)
| Kokoro: Kill Or Be Killed
| 
| align=center| 2
| align=center| 5:00
| Tokyo, Japan
| 
|-
| Win
| align=center| 5–1
| Kyle Noke
| Decision (unanimous)
| Warriors Realm 5
| 
| align=center| 5
| align=center| 5:00
| Sydney, Australia
| 
|-
| Win
| align=center| 4–1
| Sergio Lourenco
| Decision (unanimous)
| FFCF 5: Unleashed
| 
| align=center| 3
| align=center| 5:00
| Mangilao, Guam
| 
|-
| Loss
| align=center| 3–1
| Kyle Noke
| Decision (split)
| Warriors Realm 4
| 
| align=center| 3
| align=center| 5:00
| Sydney, Australia
| 
|-
| Win
| align=center| 3–0
| Marcio Bittencourt
| Submission (rear-naked choke)
| K-1 Challenge 2004 Oceania vs World
| 
| align=center| 1
| align=center| 3:30
| Gold Coast, Australia
| 
|-
| Win
| align=center| 2–0
| Kelly Jacobs
| Submission (armbar)
| Warriors Realm 2
| 
| align=center| 1
| align=center| 4:12
| Sunshine Coast, Australia
| 
|-
| Win
| align=center| 1–0
| Gavin Murie
| Submission (armbar)
| XFC 6: Ultimate Fighting Returns
| 
| align=center| 1
| align=center| 1:28
| Gold Coast, Australia
|

References

External links

Official UFC Profile

Australian male mixed martial artists
Lightweight mixed martial artists
Mixed martial artists utilizing boxing
Mixed martial artists utilizing Brazilian jiu-jitsu
Living people
1977 births
Australian people of Greek descent
Australian practitioners of Brazilian jiu-jitsu
People awarded a black belt in Brazilian jiu-jitsu
Australian male boxers
Australian submission wrestlers
Sportspeople from Geelong
Victoria University, Melbourne alumni
Australian expatriate sportspeople in the United States
Sportspeople from Vancouver, Washington
People from Washougal, Washington
Ultimate Fighting Championship male fighters